Karin Rutz-Gießelmann (born 16 January 1948) is a German fencer who competed at the 1972 and 1976 Summer Olympics in foil events; her teams finished in fifth and fourth place, respectively. She won a silver team foil medal at the 1977 World Fencing Championships.

References

External links
 

1948 births
Living people
German female fencers
Olympic fencers of West Germany
Fencers at the 1972 Summer Olympics
Fencers at the 1976 Summer Olympics
People from Offenburg
Sportspeople from Freiburg (region)